Mount Friendship, also called Friendship Peak, is a mountain summit in Manali town of Kullu district of Himachal Pradesh, India on an altitude of  above sea level.

References 

3. Friendship Peak Friendship peak is located in the Pir Panjal Ranges of the Himalayas.

Friendship